Sorgenfreispira brachystoma is a species of sea snail, a marine gastropod mollusk in the family Mangeliidae.

The subspecies Sorgenfreispira brachystoma africana Ardovini, 2004 has become a synonym of  Sorgenfreispira africana Ardovini, 2004

Description
The shell size varies between 4 mm and 7 mm.

The turreted shell is slightly, narrowly shouldered, with 7-9 narrow ribs extending from the shoulder to the base, and wider interspaces. The whole surface covered with revolving striae. Their interaction with the growth lines produce prominent, scale-like tubercles. The prominent subsutural band is narrow with a beaded ridge below the suture. The aperture is elongate-oval with an anal sinus and a short, wide siphonal canal.

The color of the shell is yellowish white, orange or occasionally deep reddish brown. Paler specimens are sometimes indistinctly brown-banded below the periphery.

Distribution
This species occurs on sand and sandy muddy bottom at depths between 4 m to 60 m in the Northeast Atlantic Ocean off Norway, in the North Sea off the British Isles, in the Atlantic Ocean off Ireland, Spain, Portugal and West Africa, and in the Mediterranean Sea and the Adriatic Sea.

Fossils have been found in various Pliocene-Pleistocene strata in England, France, Spain and Italy.

References

 Philippi, R. A. (1844). Enumeratio molluscorum Siciliae cum viventium tum in tellure tertiaria fossilium, quae in itinere suo observavit. Volumen secundum continens addenda et emendanda, nec non comparationem faunae recentis Siciliae cum faunis aliarum terrarum et com fauna periodi tertiariae. Eduard Anton, Halle [Halis Saxorum]. iv+303: 13-28
 Locard A. (1897-1898). Expéditions scientifiques du Travailleur et du Talisman pendant les années 1880, 1881, 1882 et 1883. Mollusques testacés.. Paris, Masson vol. 1 [1897], p. 1-516 pl. 1-22 vol. 2 [1898], p. 517-1044 pl. 23-40: page(s): p. 227-228, pl. 11 fig. 27-32
 Hayward, P.J.; Ryland, J.S. (Ed.) (1990). The marine fauna of the British Isles and North-West Europe: 1. Introduction and protozoans to arthropods. Clarendon Press: Oxford, UK. . 627 pp
 de Kluijver, M.J.; Ingalsuo, S.S.; de Bruyne, R.H. (2000). Macrobenthos of the North Sea [CD-ROM]: 1. Keys to Mollusca and Brachiopoda. World Biodiversity Database CD-ROM Series. Expert Center for Taxonomic Identification (ETI): Amsterdam, The Netherlands. 
 Gofas, S.; Le Renard, J.; Bouchet, P. (2001). Mollusca, in: Costello, M.J. et al. (Ed.) (2001). European register of marine species: a check-list of the marine species in Europe and a bibliography of guides to their identification. Collection Patrimoines Naturels, 50: pp. 180–213
 Paolo Mariottini, Andrea Di Giulio, Carlo Smriglio, Marco Oliverio (2008), Notes on the Bela brachystoma Complex, with Description of a New Species (Mollusca, Gastropoda: Conidae); Aldrovandia 4 2008 3-20

External links
  Della Bella G., Naldi F. & Scarponi D. (2015). Molluschi marini del Plio-Pleistocene dell'Emilia-Romagna e della Toscana - Superfamiglia Conoidea, vol. 4, Mangeliidae II. Lavori della Società Italiana di Malacologia. 26: 1-80
  Mariottini P., Di Giulio A., Smriglio C. & Oliverio M. (2015). Additional notes on the systematics and new records of East Atlantic species of the genus Sorgenfreispira Moroni, 1979 (Gastropoda Mangeliidae). Biodiversity Journal. 6(1): 431-440
 
 
 MNHN, Paris: holotype

brachystoma
Taxa named by Rodolfo Amando Philippi